Beersheba or Beer Sheva, officially Be'er-Sheva, is the largest city in the Negev desert of southern Israel.

The Biblical site of Beersheba is Tel Be'er Sheva, lying some 4 km distant from the modern city, which was established at the start of the 20th century by the Ottoman Turks. The city was captured by the British-led Australian Light Horse in the Battle of Beersheba during World War I. 

The population of the town was completely changed in 1948–49. Bir Seb'a, as it was then known, had been almost entirely Muslim and Christian, and was designated to be part of the Arab state in the 1947 United Nations Partition Plan for Palestine. In October 1948 it was captured by the Israel Defense Forces, and the Arab population was expelled. Today, the metropolitan area is composed of approximately equal Jewish and Arab populations, but the population of the core area is almost exclusively Jewish, with a large portion of the population made up of the descendants of Sephardi Jews and Mizrahi Jews who immigrated from Arab countries after 1948, as well as smaller communities of Bene Israel and Cochin Jews from India. Second and third waves of immigration have taken place since 1990, bringing Russian-speaking immigrants from the former Soviet Union, as well as Beta Israel immigrants from Ethiopia. The Soviet immigrants have made the game of chess a major sport in Beersheba, and it is now Israel's national chess center, with more chess grandmasters per capita than any other city in the world.

Beersheba is home to Ben-Gurion University of the Negev. This city also serves as a center for Israel's high-tech and developing technology industry.

The city has constructed over 250 roundabouts, earning its moniker as the "Roundabouts Capital of the Israel" and apparently the largest number in the world.

Etymology
The Book of Genesis gives two etymologies for the name Be'er Sheba. Genesis 21:28-31 relates:Then Abraham set seven ewes apart. And Abimelech said to Abraham, "What mean these seven ewes, which you have set apart? And [Abraham] said, "That you are to take these seven (sheba) ewes from me, to be for me a witness that I have dug this well (bǝ'er)." Therefore the name of that place was Be'er Sheba, for there the two of them had sworn (nishbǝ'u).Genesis 26 relates:And Isaac redug the wells which had been dug in the days of Abraham his father, and which the Philistines had sealed after the death of Abraham, and he used the same names as had his father . . . And they arose in the morning, and they swore (wa-yishabǝ'u) each to his fellow, and Isaac sent them off, and they departed him in peace. On that same day, Isaac's men came to him to tell him of the well which they had dug, and they said to him, "We found water." Alternatively, Obadiah Sforno suggested that the well is called Seven because it was the seventh dug; the narrative of Genesis 26 includes three wells dug by Abraham which are reopened by Isaac (Esek, Sitnah, Rehoboth), for a total of six, after which Isaac goes to Beersheba, the seventh well.

The double name of Shib'a and Beersheba is referenced again by the Masoretic Text in Joshua 19:2, usually translated "Beersheba or Sheba"; however the Septuagint reads "Beersheba and Samaa (Σαμαὰ)" which fits with MT 1 Chron. 4:28.

Abraham ibn Ezra and Samuel b. Meir suggest the two etymologies refer to two different cities.

Hebrew Bible
Beersheba is mainly dealt with in the Hebrew Bible in connection with the Patriarchs Abraham and Isaac, who both dig a well and close peace treaties with King Abimelech of Gerar at the site. Hence it receives its name twice, first after Abraham's dealings with Abimelech, and again from Isaac who closes his own covenant with Abimelech of Gerar and whose servants also dig a well there. The place is thus connected to two of the three Wife–sister narratives in the Book of Genesis.

According to the Hebrew Bible, Beersheba was founded when Abraham and Abimelech settled their differences over a well of water and made a covenant (see ). Abimelech's men had taken the well from Abraham after he had previously dug it so Abraham brought sheep and cattle to Abimelech to get the well back. He set aside seven lambs to swear that it was he that had dug the well and no one else. Abimelech conceded that the well belonged to Abraham and, in the Bible, Beersheba means "Well of Seven" or "Well of the Oath".

Beersheba is further mentioned in following Bible passages: Isaac built an altar in Beersheba (Genesis 26:23–33). Jacob had his dream about a stairway to heaven after leaving Beersheba. (Genesis 28:10–15 and 46:1–7). Beersheba was the territory of the tribe of Simeon and Judah (Joshua 15:28 and 19:2). The sons of the prophet Samuel were judges in Beersheba (I Samuel 8:2). Saul, Israel's first king, built a fort there for his campaign against the Amalekites (I Samuel 14:48 and 15:2–9). The prophet Elijah took refuge in Beersheba when Jezebel ordered him killed (I Kings 19:3). The prophet Amos mentions the city in regard to idolatry (Amos 5:5 and 8:14). Following the Babylonian conquest and subsequent enslavement of many Israelites, the town was abandoned. After the Israelite slaves returned from Babylon, they resettled the town. According to the Hebrew Bible, Beersheba was the southernmost city of the territories settled by Israelites, hence the expression "from Dan to Beersheba" to describe the whole kingdom.

Zibiah, the consort of King Ahaziah of Judah and the mother of King Jehoash of Judah, was from Beersheba.

History

The city has been destroyed and rebuilt many times over the centuries. Unimportant for centuries, Be’er Sheva regained importance under Byzantine rule (in the 4th–7th century), when it was a key point on the Limes Palestinae, a defense line built against the desert tribes; however, it fell to the Arabs in the 7th century and to the Turks in the 16th. It long remained a watering place and small trade centre for the nomadic Bedouin tribes of the Negev, despite Turkish efforts at town planning and development around 1900. Its capture in 1917 by the British Army opened the way for their conquest of Palestine and Syria. After being taken by Israeli troops in October 1948, Beersheba was rapidly settled by new immigrants and has since developed as the administrative, cultural, and industrial centre of the Negev. It is one of the largest cities in Israel outside of metropolitan Tel Aviv, Jerusalem, and Haifa.

Chalcolithic
Human settlement in the area dates from the Copper Age. The inhabitants lived in caves, crafting metal tools and raising cattle. Findings unearthed at Tel Sheva, an archaeological site east of modern-day Beersheba, suggest the region has been inhabited since the 4th millennium BC.

Iron Age Israelite town
	

Tel Be'er Sheva, an archaeological site containing the ruins of an ancient town believed to have been the Biblical Beersheba, lies a few kilometers east of the modern city. The town dates to the early Israelite period, around the 10th century BCE. The site was probably chosen due to the abundance of water, as evidenced by the numerous wells in the area. According to the Hebrew Bible, the wells were dug by Abraham and Isaac when they arrived there. The streets were laid out in a grid, with separate areas for administrative, commercial, military, and residential use. It is believed to have been the first planned settlement in the region, and is also noteworthy for its elaborate water system; in particular, a huge cistern carved out of the rock beneath the town.

Persian period
During the Persian rule 539 BC–c. 332 BC Beersheba was at the south of Yehud Medinata autonomous province of the Persian Achaemenid Empire. During that era the city was rebuilt and a citadel had been built. Archeological finds from between 359 and 338 BC have been made and include pottery and Ostracon.

Hellenistic period
During the Hasmonean rule, the city did not take importance as it was not mentioned when conquered from Edom or described in the Hasmonean wars.

Roman and Byzantine periods
During Roman rule the city was in the Coele-Syria region. During the Roman era and later Byzantine periods, the town served as a front-line defense against Nabatean attacks. Around 64-63 BC Gnaeus Pompeius Magnus made Be'er Sheva the southern part of the Judea province, in the following years the city was on the limes belt, which in this region is attributed to the time of Vespasian, The city become centre of an eparchy in around 268.

Beersheba was described in the Madaba Map and Eusebius of Caesarea as a large village with a Roman garrison.

Mamluk period
In 1483, during the late Mamluk era, the pilgrim Felix Fabri noted Beersheba as a city. Fabri also noted that Beersheba marked the southern-most border of "the Holy Land".

Ottoman period

The present-day city  was built to serve as an administrative center by the Ottoman administration for the benefit of the Bedouin at the outset of the 20th century and was given the name of Bir al-Sabi (well of the seven). Until World War I, it was an overwhelmingly Muslim township, with some 1,000 residents. Ben-David and Kressel have argued that the Bedouin traditional market was the cornerstone for the founding of Beersheba as capital of the Negev during this period, and Negev Bedouin anthropologist and educationalist, Aref Abu-Rabia, who worked for the Israeli Ministry of Education and Culture, described it as "the first Bedouin city."

In June 1899, the Ottoman government ordered the creation of the Beersheba sub-district (kaza) of the district (mutasarrıflık) of Jerusalem, with Beersheba to be developed as its capital. Implementation was entrusted to a special bureau of the Ministry of the Interior. There were multiple reasons for the decision. The British incorporation of Sinai into Egypt led to a need for the Ottomans to consolidate their hold on southern Palestine. There was also a desire to encourage the Bedouin to become sedentary, with a predicted increase of tranquility and tax revenue. The first governor (kaymakam), Isma'il Kamal Bey, lived in a tent lent by the local sheikh until the government house (Saraya) was built. Kamal was replaced by Muhammed Carullah Efendi in 1901, who in turn was replaced by Hamdi Bey in 1903. The governor in 1908 was promoted to 'adjoint' (mutassarrıf muavin) to the governor of the Jerusalem district, which placed him above the other sub-district governors.

A visitor to Beersheba in May 1900 found only a ruin, a two-storey stone khan, and several tents. By the start of 1901 there was a barracks with a small garrison and other buildings. The Austro-Hungarian-Czech orientalist Alois Musil noted in August 1902:
 Bir es-Seba grows from day to day; This year, instead of the tents, we found stately houses along a beautiful road from the Sarayah to the bed of the wadi. In the government building a garden has been laid out, and all sorts of trees have been planted which are sure to prosper, for the few shrubs planted two years ago by the steam mill at the south-east end of the road have grown considerably. The lively construction activity is also causing a lively exploitation of the ruins.

By 1907 there was a large village and military post, with a residence for the kaymakam and a large mosque. The population increased from 300 to 800 between 1902 and 1911, and by 1914 there were 1,000 people living in 200 houses.

A plan for the town in the form of a grid was developed by a Swiss and a German architect and two others. The grid pattern can be seen today in Beersheba's Old City. Most of the residents at the time were Arabs from Hebron and the Gaza area, although Jews also began settling in the city. Many Bedouin abandoned their nomadic lives and built homes in Beersheba.

First World War and British Mandate

During World War I, the Ottomans built a military railroad from the Hejaz line to Beersheba, inaugurating the station on October 30, 1915. The celebration was attended by the Ottoman army commander Jamal Pasha and other senior government officials. The train line was captured by Allied forces in 1917, towards the end of the war. Today, it forms part of the Israeli railway network.

Beersheba played an important role in the Sinai and Palestine Campaign in World War I. The Battle of Beersheba was part of a wider British offensive in aimed at breaking the Turkish defensive line from Gaza to Beersheba. On October 31, 1917, three months after taking Rafah, General Allenby's troops breached the line of Turkish defense between Gaza and Beersheba. Approximately five-hundred soldiers of the Australian 4th Light Horse Regiment and the 12th Light Horse Regiment of the 4th Light Horse Brigade, led by Brigadier General William Grant, with only horses and bayonets, charged the Turkish trenches, overran them and captured the wells in what has become known as the Battle of Beersheba, called the "last successful cavalry charge in British military history." On the edge of Beersheba's Old City is a Commonwealth War Graves Commission Cemetery containing the graves of Australian, New Zealand and British soldiers. The town also contains a memorial park dedicated to them.

During the Palestine Mandate, Beersheba was a major administrative center. The British constructed a railway between Rafah and Beersheba in October 1917; it opened to the public in May 1918, serving the Negev and settlements south of Mount Hebron. In 1928, at the beginning of the tension between the Jews and the Arabs over control of Palestine, and wide-scale rioting which left 133 Jews dead and 339 wounded, many Jews abandoned Beersheba, although some returned occasionally. After an Arab attack on a Jewish bus in 1936, which escalated into the 1936–39 Arab revolt in Palestine, the remaining Jews left.

At the time of the 1922 census of Palestine, Beersheba had a population of 2,012 Muslims, 235 Christians, 98 Jews and 11 Druze (total 2,356). At the time of the 1931 census, Beersheba had 545 occupied houses and a population of 2,791 Muslims, 152 Christians, 11 Jews and 5 Baháʼí (total 2,959). The 1945 village survey conducted by the Palestine Mandate government found 5,360 Muslims, 200 Christians and 10 others (total 5,570).

State of Israel

1947–1949 war

In 1947, the United Nations Special Committee on Palestine (UNSCOP) proposed that Beersheba be included within the Jewish state in their partition plan for Palestine. However, when the UN's Ad Hoc Committee revised the plan, they moved Beersheva to the Arab state on account of it being primarily Arab. Egyptian forces had been stationed at Beersheva since May 1948.

According to Israeli historian Benny Morris, he ordered the "conquest of Beersheba, occupation of outposts around it, [and] demolition of most of the town." The objective was to break the Egyptian blockade of Israeli convoys to the Negev. The Egyptian army did not expect an offensive and fled en masse. By 9:45, Beersheba was in Israeli hands. Around 120 Egyptian soldiers were taken prisoner. All of the Arab inhabitants who had resisted, were expelled  with the remaining Arab civilians, 200 men and 150 women and children, taken to the police fort and, on October 25, the women, children, disabled and elderly were driven by truck to the Gaza border. The Egyptian soldiers were interned in POW camps. Some men lived in the local mosque and were put to work cleaning but when it was discovered that they were supplying information to the Egyptian army they were also deported. The town was subject to large-scale looting by the Haganah, and by December, in one calculation, the total number of Arabs driven out from Beersheva and surrounding areas reached 30,000 with many ending up in Jordan as refugees. Following Operation Yoav, a 10-kilometer radius exclusion zone around Beersheba was enforced into which no Bedouin were allowed. In response, the United Nations Security Council passed two resolutions on the 4th and 16 November demanding that Israel withdraw from the area.

First four decades
Following the conclusion of the war, the 1949 Armistice Agreements formally granted Beersheba to Israel. The town was then transformed into an Israeli city with only an exiguous Arab minority. Beersheba was deemed strategically important due to its location with a reliable water supply and at a major crossroads, northwest to Hebron and Jerusalem, east to the Dead Sea and al Karak, south to Aqaba, west to Gaza and southwest to Al-Auja and the border with Egypt.

After a few months, the town's war-damaged houses were repaired. As a post-independence wave of Jewish immigration to Israel began, Beersheba experienced a population boom as thousands of immigrants moved in. The city rapidly expanded beyond its core, which became known as the "Old City," as new neighborhoods were built around it, complete with various housing projects such as apartment buildings and houses with auxiliary farms, as well as shopping centers and schools. The Old City was turned into a city center, with shops, restaurants, and government and utility offices. An industrial area and one of the largest cinemas in Israel were also built in the city. By 1956, Beersheba was a booming city of 22,000. In 1959, during the Wadi Salib riots, riots spread quickly to other parts of the country, including Beersheba.

Soroka Hospital opened its doors in 1960. By 1968, the population had grown to 80,000. The University of the Negev, which would later become Ben-Gurion University of the Negev, was established in 1969. The then Egyptian president Anwar Sadat visited Beersheba in 1979. In 1983, its population was more than 110,000. During the 1990s post-Soviet aliyah, the city's population greatly increased as many immigrants from the former Soviet Union settled there.

Urban development in the 21st century

As part of its Blueprint Negev project, the Jewish National Fund funded major redevelopment projects in Beersheba. One project was the Beersheba River Walk, a  riverfront district with green spaces, hiking trails, a 3,000-seat sports hall, a  boating lake filled with recycled waste water, promenades, restaurants, cafés, galleries, boat rentals, a 12,000-seat amphitheater, playgrounds, and a bridge along the route of the city's Mekorot water pipes. At the official entrance to the river park is the Beit Eshel Park, which consists of a park built around a courtyard with historic remains from the settlement of Beit Eshel.

Four new shopping malls were also built. Among them is Kanyon Beersheba, a  ecologically planned mall with pools for collecting rainwater and lighting generated by solar panels on the roof. It will be situated next to an 8,000-meter park with bicycle paths. In addition, the first ever farmer's market in Israel was established as an enclosed, circular complex with 400 spaces for vendors surrounded by parks and greenery.

A new central bus station was built in the city. The station has a glass-enclosed complex also containing shops and cafés.

Some $10.5 million was also invested in renovating Beersheba's Old City, preserving historical buildings and upgrading infrastructure. The Turkish Quarter was also redeveloped with newly cobbled streets, widened sidewalks, and the restoration of Turkish homes into areas for dining and shopping.

In 2011, city hall announced plans to turn Beersheba into the "water city" of Israel. One of the projects, "Beersheva beach," is a 7-dunam fountain opposite city hall. Other projects included fountains near the Soroka Medical Center and in front of the Shamoon College of Engineering.

In the 1990s, as skyscrapers began to appear in Israel, the construction of high-rise buildings began in Beersheba. Today, downtown Beersheba has been described as a "clean, compact, and somewhat sterile-looking collection of high-rise office and residential towers." The city's tallest building is Rambam Square 2, a 32-story apartment building. Many additional high-rise buildings are planned or are under construction, including skyscrapers. There are further plans to build luxury residential towers in the city.

In December 2012, a plan to build 16,000 new housing units in the Ramot Gimel neighborhood was scrapped in favor of creating a new urban forest, which spans  and serves as the area's "green lung", as part of the plans to develop a "green band" around the city. The forest includes designated picnic areas, biking trails, and walking trails. According to Mayor Ruvik Danilovich, Beersheba still has an abundance of open, underdeveloped spaces that can be used for urban development.

In 2017, a new urban building plan was approved for the city, designed to raise the city's population to 340,000 by 2030. Under the plan, 13,000 more housing units will be built, along with industrial and business developments occupying a total of four million square meters. A second public hospital is also planned. Planning for a light rail system also began. In 2019, the construction of a new public hospital, which will be named after Shimon Peres, was approved. The hospital will be a  complex that will feature 1,900 beds, commerce, hotel, alternative medicine, and paramedical services, and research centers, with the possibility of apartment units for medical faculty employees, students, and senior housing. It will be linked to the rest of the city by a light rail system.

Security incidents in the city
On October 19, 1998, sixty four people were wounded in a grenade attack. 
On August 31, 2004, sixteen people were killed in two suicide bombings on commuter buses in Beersheba for which Hamas claimed responsibility. On August 28, 2005, another suicide bomber attacked the central bus station, seriously injuring two security guards and 45 bystanders. During Operation Cast Lead, which began on December 27, 2008, and lasted until the ceasefire on January 18, 2009, Hamas fired 2,378 rockets (such as Grad rockets) and mortars, from Gaza into southern Israel, including Beersheba. The rocket attacks have continued, but have been only partially effective since the introduction of the Iron Dome rocket defense system.

In 2010, an Arab attacked and injured two people with an axe. In 2012, a Palestinian from Jenin was stopped before a stabbing attack in a "safe house." On October 18, 2015, a lone gunman shot and killed a soldier guarding the Beersheva bus station before being gunned down by police. In September 2016, the Shin Bet thwarted a Palestinian Islamic Jihad terror attack at a wedding hall in Beersheba.

On March 22, 2022, a convicted Islamic State supporter carried out a stabbing and vehicle-ramming attack, killing four people and injuring two others.

Emblem of Beersheba

Since 1950, Beersheba has changed its municipal emblem several times. 
The 1950 emblem, designed by Abraham Khalili, featured a tamarix tree, a factory and water flowing from a pipeline. In 1972 the emblem was modernized with the symbolic representation of the Twelve Tribes and a tower. Words from the Bible are inscribed: Abraham "planted a tamarix tree in Beersheba." (Genesis 21:33) Since 2012, it has incorporated the number seven as part of the city rebranding.

Geography

The city is located on the main route from the center and north of the country to Eilat in the far south. The Beersheba Valley has been populated for thousands of years, as it has available water, which flows from the Hebron hills in the winter and is stored underground in vast quantities. The main river in Beersheba is Nahal Beersheva, a wadi that floods in the winter. The Kovshim and Katef streams are other important wadis that pass through the city. Beersheba is surrounded by a number of satellite towns, including Omer, Lehavim, and Meitar, and the Bedouin localities of Rahat, Tel as-Sabi, and Lakiya. Due to heavy construction the flora unique to the area is endangered.
North east of the city (north to the Neve Menahem neighborhood) there are Loess plains and dry river bands.

Climate
Beersheba has a hot semi arid (Köppen climate classification BSh) with Mediterranean influences. The city has both characteristics of Mediterranean and desert climates. Summers are hot and dry, and winters are mild. Rainfall is highly concentrated in the winter season. Snow is very rare; a snowfall on February 20, 2015, was the first such occurrence in the city since 2000.

There are sandstorms in summer. Haze and fog are common in winter, as a result of high humidity.

Demography
Beersheba is one of the fastest-growing cities in Israel. Though it has a population of about 200,000, the city is larger in area than Tel Aviv, and its urban plan calls for an eventual population of 450,000–500,000. It is planned to have a population of 340,000 by 2030. In 2010, the National Council for Planning and Construction approved a master plan with the goal of increasing the population of Beersheba and its metropolitan area to 1 million by 2020. The population of Beersheba is predominantly Jewish. Jews and others represent 97.3% of the population, of whom Jews are 86.5%. Arabs constitute around 2.69% of city population. 
The Israel Central Bureau of Statistics divides the Beersheba metropolitan area into two areas:

Economy

The largest employers in Beersheba are Soroka Medical Center, the municipality, Israel Defense Forces and Ben-Gurion University. A major Israel Aerospace Industries complex is located in the main industrial zone, north of Highway 60. Numerous electronics and chemical plants, including Teva Pharmaceutical Industries, are located in and around the city.

Beersheba is emerging as a high-tech center, with an emphasis on cyber security. A large high-tech park is being built near the Be'er Sheva North Railway Station. Deutsche Telekom, Elbit Systems, EMC, Lockheed Martin, Ness Technologies, WeWork and RAD Data Communications have already opened facilities there, as has a cyberincubator run by Jerusalem Venture Partners. A Science park funded by the RASHI-SACTA Foundation, Beersheba Municipality and private donors was completed in 2008. Another high-tech park is located north of the city near Omer.

An additional three industrial zones are located on the southeastern side of the city – Makhteshim, Emek Sara and Kiryat Yehudit – and a light industry zone between Kiryat Yehudit and the Old City.

Local government

The mayor of Beersheba is Ruvik Danilovich, who was deputy mayor under Yaakov Turner.

Educational institutions

According to the Municipality CBS, in 2022, Beersheba has a ca.8,975 preschoolers in ca.300 preschools & kindergartens. A total of 99 schools teaching a student population of ca.45,291: 60 elementary schools with an enrollment of 19,617 (ca.3,200 of whom are entering the 1st grade), and 39 high schools with an enrollment of 16,699. Of Beersheba's 12th graders, 90% earned a Bagrut matriculation certificate in 2022. The city also has several private schools and yeshivot in the religious sector with 3,000 or more students.

Beersheba is home to one of Israel's major universities, Ben-Gurion University of the Negev, located on an urban campus in the city (Dalet neighborhood). Other schools in Beersheva are the Open University of Israel, Shamoon College of Engineering (SCE), Kaye Academic College of Education, Practical Engineering College of Beersheba, and a campus of the Israeli Air and Space College (Techni Be'er sheva ).

Neighborhoods

After Israeli independence, Beersheba became a "laboratory" for Israeli architecture. Mishol Girit, a neighborhood built in the late 1950s, was the first attempt to create an alternative to the standard public housing projects in Israel. Today, Beersheba is divided into seventeen residential neighborhoods in addition to the Old City and Ramot, an umbrella neighborhood of four sub-districts. Many of the neighbourhoods are named after letters of the Hebrew alphabet, which also have numerical value, but descriptive place names have been given to some of the newer neighborhoods.

Art and cultural institutions

In 1953, Cinema Keren, the Negev's first movie theater, opened in Beersheba. It was built by the Histadrut and had seating for 1,200 people. 
Beersheba is the home base of the Israel Sinfonietta, founded in 1973. Over the years, the Sinfonietta has developed a broad repertoire of symphonic works, concerti for solo instruments and large choral productions, among them Handel's Israel in Egypt, masses by Schubert and Mozart, Rossini's "Stabat Mater" and Vivaldi's "Gloria." World-famous artists have appeared as soloists with the Sinfonietta, including Pinchas Zukerman, Jean-Pierre Rampal, Shlomo Mintz, Gary Karr, and Paul Tortelier. In the 1970s, a memorial commemorating fallen Israeli soldiers designed by the sculptor Danny Karavan was erected on a hill north-east of the city. The Beersheba Theater opened in 1973. The Light Opera Group of the Negev, established in 1980, performs musicals in English every year.

Landmarks in the city include "Abraham's well", a well dating to at least the 12th century CE (now inside a visitors center), and the old Turkish railway station, now the focus of development plans. The Artists House of the Negev, in a Mandate-era building, showcases artwork connected in some way to the Negev.

The Negev Museum of Art reopened in 2004 in the Ottoman Governor's House, and an art and media center for young people was established in the Old City.

In 2009, a new tourist and information center, Gateway to the Negev, was built.

Great Mosque of Beersheba

In 1906, during the Ottoman era, the Great Mosque of Beersheba was built with donations collected from the Bedouin residents in the Negev. It was used actively as a mosque until the city fell to Israeli forces in 1948. The mosque was used until 1953 as the city's courthouse. From then until the 1990s, when it was closed for renovations, the building housed an archeological museum, which the city intended to turn into the archeological branch of the Negev Museum. In 2011, however, the Supreme Court of Israel, sitting as the High Court of Justice, ordered the property to be turned into a museum of Islam without reverting to a place of worship.

Transportation

Beersheba is the central transport hub of southern Israel, served by roads, railways and air. Beersheba is connected to Tel Aviv via Highway 40, the second longest highway in Israel, which passes to the east of the city and is called the Beersheba bypass because it allows travellers from the north to go to southern locations, avoiding the more congested city center. From west to east, the city is divided by Highway 25, which connects to Ashkelon and the Gaza Strip to the northwest, and Dimona to the east. Finally, Highway 60 connects Beersheba with Jerusalem and the Shoket Junction, and goes through the West Bank. On the local level, a partial ring road surrounds the city from the north and east, and Road 406 (Rager Blvd.) goes through the city center from north to south.

Metrodan Beersheba, established in 2003, had a fleet of 90 buses and operates 19 lines in the city between 2003 and 2016, most of which depart from the Beersheba Central Bus Station. These lines were formerly operated by the municipality as the 'Be'er Sheva Urban Bus Services'. Inter-city buses to and from Beersheba are operated by Egged, Dan BaDarom and Metropoline. The intercity bus service was transferred to Dan Be'er Sheva in 25'th of November 2016 and Metrodan Beersheva had been shut down. With the change to Dan Be'er Sheva the company introduced electronic payment stopping pay at the driver which was common in Beersheba.

Israel Railways operates two stations in the city that form part of the railway to Beersheba: the old Be'er Sheva North University station, adjacent to Ben Gurion University and Soroka Medical Center, and the new Be'er Sheva Central station, adjacent to the central bus station. Between the two stations, the railway splits into two, and also continues to Dimona and the Dead Sea factories. An extension is planned to Eilat and Arad.

The Be'er Sheva North University station is the terminus of the line to Dimona. All stations of Israel Railways can be accessed from Beersheba using transfer stations in Tel Aviv and Lod. Until 2012, the railway line to Beersheba used a slow single-track configuration with sharp curves and many level crossings which limited train speed. Between 2004 and 2012 the line was double tracked and rebuilt using an improved alignment and all its level crossings were grade separated. The rebuilding effort cost NIS 2.8 billion and significantly reduced the travel time and greatly increased the train frequency to and from Tel Aviv and Kiryat Motzkin to Beersheba. In addition, Beersheba will be linked to Tel Aviv and Eilat by a new passenger and freight high-speed railway system.

There have been plans for a light rail system in Beersheba for many years, and a light rail system appears in the master plan for the city. An agreement was signed for the construction of a light rail system in 1998, but was not implemented. In 2008, the Israeli Finance Ministry contemplated freezing the Tel Aviv Light Rail project and building a light rail system in Beersheba instead, but that did not happen. In 2014, mayor Ruvik Danilovich announced that the light rail system will be built in the city. In 2017, the Ministry of Transport gave the Beersheba municipality approval to proceed with preliminary planning on a light rail system.

Roundabouts

In Be'er Sheva there are over 250 roundabouts, giving the city its nickname of "Roundabout Capital of Israel". Many roundabouts, part of Be'er-Sheva's urban oasis project, include fountains, landscaping and sculptures by  well-known artists (such as Menashe Kadishman's The Horse Circle and Jeremy Langford's The Drip Circle). Some commemorate famous people and international and local organizations, or mark important events. Some are named after the twin cities of Beer Sheva.

Well-known roundabouts are: Ilan Ramon Circle, Phantom Circle near the Air Force Technical School, Champions Square near Terner Stadium and Conch Arena, Chess Circle, Harp Circle near the Municipal Conservatory and the Be'er-Sheva Performing Arts Center, College Circle, Ben Gurion Circle, Light Circle, Freemasons Circle, Shofarot Circle, Twin Towers Circle.

Hiking
Beersheba is linked to Hilvan by the Abraham Path.

Sports
Hapoel Be'er Sheva plays in the Israeli Premier League, the top tier of Israeli football, having been promoted in the 2008–2009 Liga Leumit season. The club has won the Israeli championship five times, in 1975, 1976, 2016, 2017 and 2018, as well as the State Cup in 1997, 2020 and 2022. Beersheba has two other local clubs, Maccabi Be'er Sheva (based in Neve Noy) and F.C. Be'er Sheva (based in the north of Dalet), a continuation of the defunct Beitar Avraham Be'er Sheva. Hapoel play at the Turner Stadium.

Beersheba has a basketball club, Hapoel Be'er Sheva. The team plays at The Conch Arena, which seats 3,000.

Beersheba has become Israel's national chess center; thanks to Soviet immigration, it is home to the largest number of chess grandmasters of any city in the world. The city hosted the World Team Chess Championship in 2005, and chess is taught in the city's kindergartens. The Israeli chess team won the silver medal at the 2008 Chess Olympiad and the bronze at the 2010 Olympiad. The chess club was founded in 1973 by Eliyahu Levant, who is still the driving spirit behind it.

The city has the second largest wrestling center (AMI wrestling school) in Israel.  The center is run by Leonid Shulman and has approximately 2,000 students, most of whom are from Russian immigrant families since the origins of the club are in the Nahal Beka immigrant absorption center. Maccabi Be'er Sheva has a freestyle wrestling team, whilst Hapoel Be'er Sheva has a Greco-Roman wrestling team. In the 2010 World Wrestling Championships, AMI students won five medals. Cricket is played under the auspices of Israel Cricket Association. Beersheba is also home to a rugby team, whose senior and youth squads have won several national titles (including the recent Senior National League 2004–2005 championship). Beersheba's tennis center, which opened in 1991, features eight lighted courts, and the Beersheba (Teyman) airfield is used for gliding.

Environmental awards
In 2012, the Beersheba "ring trail", a 42-kilometer hiking trail around the city, won third place in the annual environmental competition of the European Travelers Association.

Notable people

 Orna Banai (born 1966), actress, comedian, and entertainer
 Elyaniv Barda (born 1981), footballer
 Zehava Ben (born 1968), singer
 Avishay Braverman (born 1948), professor and politician, president of the Ben-Gurion University of the Negev
 Almog Cohen (born 1988), footballer
 Ruvik Danilovich (born 1971), 8th mayor of Be'er - Sheva
 Anat Draigor (born 1960), basketball player
 Eli Alaluf (born 1945), politician
 Ronit Elkabetz (1964–2016), actress
 Velvl Greene (1928–2011), Canadian–American–Israeli scientist and academic
 Zvika Hadar (born 1966), comedian and show host
 Boaz Huss (born 1959), professor of Kabbalah at Ben-Gurion University of the Negev
Ron Kaplan (born 1970), Olympic gymnast
 Victor Mikhalevski (born 1972), chess grandmaster
 David Naccache (born 1967), cryptologist, professor at France's Ecole normale supérieure
 David Newman (born 1956), professor and Dean of Social Science and Humanities, BGU
 Ilan Ramon (1954–2003), Israel's first astronaut; died in the Columbia disaster
 Yehudit Ravitz (born 1956), singer
Idan Tal (born 1975), footballer 
 Eli Zizov (born 1991), footballer
 Ze'ev Zrizi (1916–2011), second mayor of Beersheba

Twin towns – sister cities

Beersheba is twinned with:

 Adana, Turkey
 Addis Ababa, Ethiopia
 Cluj-Napoca, Romania
 Lyon, France
 Niš, Serbia
 Oni, Georgia
 Parramatta, Australia
 La Plata, Argentina

 Seattle, United States
 Montreal, Canada
 Winnipeg, Canada
 Wuppertal, Germany
 Munich, Germany

See also
Be'er Sheva Municipal Website
My Be'er-Sheva
 Battle of Beersheba (First World War)
 Beer Sheva Park, Seattle
 Map of Beersheba and surrounds in the 1940s and 1950s

References

Bibliography

External links

 Beersheba City Council
 Selection of photos from Beer Sheva from flickr
 Ben-Gurion University
 The city of Beersheba: a tourist's guide
 Beer-Sheva – Historical article from the Catholic Encyclopaedia
 Light Horse charges again Article written by Martin Chulov, published in The Australian, November 1, 2007, the descendants of the Australian light-horsemen rode into the centre of Beersheva, re-enacting the gallant gallop of October 31, 1917
 Israel Builds Expansion and architecture of Beersheva in the 1960s and 1970s
 Blueprint for Beersheba

 Tsagai Asamain, Be'er Sheva-Compound C:Conservation measures during the excavation, Israel Antiquities Authority Site – Conservation Department
 Yardena Etgar and Ofer Cohen, Tel Be’er Sheva: The Underground Water Reservoir System, Israel Antiquities Authority Site – Conservation Department
 Shauli Sela and Fuad Abu-Taa, The Turkish Mosque and the Governor's House: Conservation of the stone and plaster, Israel Antiquities Authority Site – Conservation Department
Survey of Western Palestine, Map 24: IAA, Wikimedia commons
BeerSheva.city, the first French portal of the city

 
Cities in Southern District (Israel)
Beersheba
Chess in Israel
Hebrew Bible cities
Torah cities
Establishments in the Kingdom of Israel (united monarchy)
1900s establishments in Ottoman Syria